Vanuatu competed at the 2012 Summer Olympics in London, from 27 July to 12 August 2012. This was the nation's seventh appearance at the Olympics.

The Vanuatu Association of Sports and National Olympic Committee (VASNOC) sent the nation's largest delegation to the Games since 1992. Five athletes, three men and two women, were selected to the team to compete in three different sports. Although Vanuatu's earlier Olympic appearances were primarily characterized by athletes competing in the track and field (except the 2000 Summer Olympics in Sydney, and the 2008 Summer Olympics in Beijing, where they included an archer and a table tennis player respectively), this nation made its Olympic debut in judo. Among the athletes competing at these games, table tennis player Anolyn Lulu, the oldest of the team at age 33, became Vanuatu's second female flag bearer at the opening ceremony.

Vanuatu has yet to win its first ever Olympic medal, as none of these athletes advanced past the first round of their respective sporting events.

Athletics

Vanuatu qualified by one athlete for the Men's 800 metres and qualified one athlete for the Women's 100 metres under the universality criteria.

Men

Women

Key
Note–Ranks given for track events are within the athlete's heat only
Q = Qualified for the next round
q = Qualified for the next round as a fastest loser or, in field events, by position without achieving the qualifying target
NR = National record
N/A = Round not applicable for the event
Bye = Athlete not required to compete in round

Judo

Vanuatu  qualified 1 judoka in the men's heavyweight class through additional places for Oceania

Table tennis

Vanuatu qualified one player for the men's singles through the Oceania Qualification Tournament and qualified one player for the women's singles through the Oceania Qualification Tournament.

References 

Nations at the 2012 Summer Olympics
2012
Olympics